Frida Lundell (6 March 1899 – 19 August 1934) was a Swedish missionary. She served with the Swedish Missionary Society in Chinese Turkestan (present day Xinjiang).

Lundell was born in Valö in Uppland, Sweden. She worked as a nurse midwife in Yarkand for around 7 years in periods during the years 1925 - 1934. She died in Yarkand 1934 of typhoid at the age of 35.

1899 births
1934 deaths
Swedish Protestant missionaries
Protestant missionaries in China
Swedish midwives
Deaths from typhoid fever
Christian medical missionaries
Female Christian missionaries
Swedish expatriates in China